Nenad Vanić (Serbian Cyrillic: Ненад Ванић; born 30 August 1970) is a Serbian football manager and former player.

Playing career
In the summer of 1997, following a brief spell with Vojvodina, Vanić moved abroad an signed with Spanish club Albacete. He spent the next three seasons there, before moving to Belgian side Lokeren. After a year at Daknamstadion, Vanić switched to fellow league club Gent. He made a total of 77 appearances and scored 17 goals in the top flight of Belgian football between 2000 and 2003. Subsequently, Vanić briefly played for Chinese side Tianjin Teda, before returning to his homeland and joining Borac Čačak in early 2004.

Managerial career
Shortly after retiring as a player, Vanić took over the managerial role at Radnički Nova Pazova in early 2010. He led the club to win the Serbian League Vojvodina in 2012, thus earning promotion to the Serbian First League.

In May 2015, Vanić was appointed manager of Metalac Gornji Milanovac. He subsequently led the club to victory against Napredak Kruševac in the promotion playoffs, thus securing a spot in the 2015–16 Serbian SuperLiga.

After Metalac, Vanić managed Vojvodina, Proleter Novi Sad and UAE Pro League club Hatta. In the summer of 2019, he was appointed manager of Serbian SuperLiga club Radnik Surdulica. After 9 games in charge, with three defeats, two draws and four wins, Vanić was fired on 29 October 2019.

Honours

Player
Red Star Belgrade
 FR Yugoslavia Cup: 1996–97

Manager
Radnički Nova Pazova
 Serbian League Vojvodina: 2011–12
Proleter Novi Sad
 Serbian First League: 2017–18

References

External links
 
 

Albacete Balompié players
Association football defenders
Association football midfielders
Belgian Pro League players
Chinese Super League players
Expatriate football managers in the United Arab Emirates
Expatriate footballers in Belgium
Expatriate footballers in China
Expatriate footballers in Spain
First League of Serbia and Montenegro players
FK BASK players
FK Bežanija players
FK Borac Čačak players
FK Budućnost Podgorica players
FK Mladost Lučani players
FK Obilić players
FK Vojvodina managers
FK Vojvodina players
K.A.A. Gent players
Kosovo Serbs
K.S.C. Lokeren Oost-Vlaanderen players
Red Star Belgrade footballers
Segunda División players
Serbia and Montenegro expatriate footballers
Serbia and Montenegro expatriate sportspeople in Belgium
Serbia and Montenegro expatriate sportspeople in China
Serbia and Montenegro expatriate sportspeople in Spain
Serbia and Montenegro footballers
Serbian expatriate football managers
Serbian expatriate sportspeople in the United Arab Emirates
Serbian First League players
Serbian football managers
Serbian footballers
Serbian SuperLiga managers
Serbian SuperLiga players
Sportspeople from Pristina
Tianjin Jinmen Tiger F.C. players
1970 births
Living people